Maximiliano Ángel Coronel (born 28 April 1989 in Buenos Aires) is an Argentine football player, who plays as a centre-back for Cúcuta Deportivo in the Colombian Categoría Primera A.

Career
Coronel made his competitive debut on 19 August 2009, in a 1-2 home defeat to Lanus in Copa Sudamericana 2009. He made his league debut four days later on 23 August 2009, in a 2-0 away defeat to Banfield. During Apertura 2009 tournament Coronel appeared regularly for the first team.

External links
 
 
 
 

1989 births
Living people
Argentine footballers
Argentine expatriate footballers
Footballers from Buenos Aires
Argentine people of Italian descent
Association football defenders
Club Atlético River Plate footballers
All Boys footballers
Club de Gimnasia y Esgrima La Plata footballers
Cúcuta Deportivo footballers
Argentine Primera División players
Categoría Primera A players
Argentine expatriate sportspeople in Colombia
Expatriate footballers in Colombia